The Mausoleum of Genghis Khan is a temple dedicated to Genghis Khan, where he is worshipped as ancestor, dynastic founder, and deity. The temple is better called the Lord's Enclosure (i.e. shrine), the traditional name among the Mongols, as it has never truly contained the Khan's body. It is the main centre of the worship of Genghis Khan, a growing practice in the Mongolian shamanism of both Inner Mongolia, where the temple is located, and Mongolia.

The temple is located in the Kandehuo Enclosure in the town of Xinjie, in the Ejin Horo Banner in the Ordos Prefecture of Inner Mongolia, in China. The main hall is actually a cenotaph where the coffin contains no body (only headdresses and accessories), because the actual tomb of Genghis Khan has never been discovered.

The present structure was built between 1954 and 1956 by the government of the People's Republic of China in the traditional Mongol style. It was desecrated and its relics destroyed during the Cultural Revolution, but it was restored with replicas in the 1980s and remains the center of Genghis Khan worship. It was named a AAAAA-rated tourist attraction by China's National Tourism Administration in 2011.

Location

It is the namesake of its surrounding banner, whose name translates from Mongolian as "the Lord's Enclosure".

There is a new interchange on highway 210 leading directly to the site.

History

Early sites

After Genghis Khan died in or around Gansu on 12 July AD1227, his remains were supposedly carried back to central Mongolia and buried secretly and without markings, in accordance with his personal directions. His actual burial site remains unknown but was almost certainly not in Ejin Horo, which had only recently been conquered from the Tangut Empire. Without a body, the Mongols honored the khan's memory and spirit through his personal effects. These ceremonies allegedly date to the same year as his death. Kublai Khan built temples for his grandfather's cult in Daidu and Shangdu. Nine "palaces" for rituals concerning his cult were maintained by an imperial official in Karakorum.

After the fall of the Yuan in 1368, these permanent structures were replaced by portable mausoleums called the "eight white yurts" (naiman tsagaan ger). These had originally been palaces where the khan had lived, but were altered to mausoleums by Ögedei Khan. These yurts were first encamped at Avraga site at the base of the Khentii Mountains in Delgerkhaan in Mongolia's Khentii Province.

Ordos

The shrine was entrusted to caretakers known as the Darkhad. Their leader was chosen from the Borjigin clan and was known as the Jinong since the first, Kamala, had been appointed King of Jin. The Darkhad moved from the Kherlen River to the Ordos, which took its name (Mongolian for "palaces") from the mausoleum's presence there. The caretakers oversaw commemorative and religious rituals and were visited by pilgrims. Mongol khans were also crowned at the yurts.

Under the Qing, 500 Darkhad were exempted from military service and taxation; the shrine also received 500 taels (about ) of silver each year to maintain its rituals. The site's rituals became more local, more open to lower-class people, and more Buddhist.

The Mongolian prince Toghtakhutörü and the Darkhad built a permanent mausoleum in Setsen Khan Aimag in 1864. This traditional Chinese structure was described by a Belgian missionary in 1875 but was destroyed at the Panchen Lama's suggestion in order to end an outbreak of plague among the Darkhad in early 20th century.

Around the fall of the Qing, the mausoleum became notable as a symbol for Mongolian nationalists. The Buryat scholar Tsyben Zhamtsarano advocated a removal of the shrine to northern Mongolia . After the Mongolian Revolution, a sacrificial rite was held for Genghis Khan to "bring peace and safety to... human beings and other creatures" and to "drive out bandits, thieves, illness, and other internal and external malefactions" in 1912. Some Mongolians planned to remove some of the ritual objects—particularly the Black Sülde, an allegedly magical heaven-sent trident—to the independent northern Mongolian territory from the Inner Mongolian shrine; in 1914, a letter from the Beijing office overseeing Mongolia and Tibet ordered Arbinbayar, the head of the Ihe Juu League, that

In 1915, Zhang Xiangwen (t s pZhāng Xiāngwén, wChang Hsiang-wen) began the scholarly controversy over the site of Genghis Khan's tomb by publishing an article claiming that it was in Ejin Horo.

During World War II, Prince Demchugdongrub, the notional leader of the Japanese puppet government in Mongolia, ordered that the mobile tomb and its relics be moved to avoid a supposed "Chinese plot to plunder it". This was rebuffed by the local leader Shagdarjab, who claimed that the shrines could never be moved and locals would resist any attempt to do so. When he accepted Japanese weaponry to defend it, however, the Nationalist government became alarmed at the possibility of Japan using the cult of Genghis Khan to lead a Mongolian separatist movement. The yurts and their relics were to be removed to Qinghai either at their armed insistence or at Shagdarjab's invitation. (Accounts differ.) The Japanese still attempted to use the cult of Genghis Khan to fan Mongolian nationalism; from 1941–4, the IJA colonel Kanagawa Kosaku constructed a separate mausoleum in Ulan Hot consisting of 3 main buildings in a  estate.

Gansu
Once in Chinese hands, the relics did not go to Qinghai as planned. On 17 May 1939, 200 specially-selected Nationalist troops conveyed the relics to Yan'an, then the principal base of the Chinese Communists. Upon their arrival on 21 June 1939, the Communists held a large public sacrifice to Genghis Khan with a crowd of about ten thousand spectators; the Central Committee presented memorial wreathes; and Mao Zedong produced a new sign for it in his calligraphy, reading "Genghis Khan Memorial Hall" (t s Chéngjísī Hán Jìniàntáng). As part of the Second United Front, it was allowed to pass out of the Communist controlled area to Xi'an, where Shaanxi governor Jiang Dingwen officiated another religious ritual before a crowd of tens of thousands on 25 June. (Accounts vary from thirty to 200,000.) Li Yiyan, a member of the Nationalists' provincial committee, wrote the booklet China's National Hero Genghis Khan (t s Zhōnghuá Mínzú Yīngxióng Chéngjísī Hán) to commemorate the event, listing the khan as a great Chinese leader in the mold of the First Emperor, Emperor Wu, and Emperor Taizong. A few days later, the Gansu governor Zhu Shaoliang held a similar ritual before enshrining the khan's relics at the Dongshan Dafo Dian on Xinglong Mountain in Yuzhong County. The Gansu government sent soldiers and a chief official for the shrine and brought the remaining Darkhad onto the provincial government's payroll; the original 500 Darkhad were reduced to a mere seven or eight. Following this  journey, the shrine remained there for ten years.

Qinghai
At the conclusion of the Chinese Civil War, the Nationalist guard at the temple fled before the Communist advance into Gansu in the summer of 1949. Plans were put forward to move the khan's shrine to the Alxa League in western Inner Mongolia or to Mount Emei in Sichuan. Following the Communist conquest of Xining a few months later, the Communist general He Banyan sacrificed three sheep to the khan and offered ceremonial scarves (hadag) and a banner reading "National Hero" ( Mínzú Yīngxióng) to the temple housing his shrine.

Present-day mausoleum
Ejin Horo fell to the Communists at the end of 1949 and was controlled by their Northwest Bureau until the establishment of Suiyuan Province the next year. The district's Communists set up rituals honouring Genghis Khan in the early 1950s, but abolished the traditional religious offices surrounding them like the Jinong and controlled the cult through local committees with loyal Party cadres. Without the relics, they relied largely on singing and dancing groups. In 1953, the PRC's central government approved the recently-formed Inner Mongolian provincial government's request for 800,000 to create the present permanent structures. Early the next year, the central government permitted the return of the objects at Kumbum to the site being constructed at Ejin Horo. The region's chairman Ulanhu officiated at the first ritual after their return, decrying the Nationalists for having "stolen" them. After this ritual, he immediately held a second ceremony to break ground on a permanent temple to house the objects and the khan's cult, again approved and paid for by China's central government. By 1956, this new temple was completed, greatly expanding the purview of the original shrine. Rather than having eight separate shrines throughout Ejin Horo for the Great Khan, his wives, and his children, all were placed together; a further 20 sacred and venerated objects from around the Ordos were also brought to the new site. The government also mandated that the main ritual would be held in the summer rather than in the third lunar month, in order to make it more convenient for the headers to maintain their spring work schedules. With the Darkhads no longer liable for personally paying for maintenance of the shrine, most accepted these changes. An especially large celebration was held in 1962 to mark the 800th anniversary of Genghis Khan's birth.

In 1968, the Cultural Revolution's Red Guards destroyed almost everything of value at the shrine. For 10 years, the buildings themselves were turned into a salt depot as part of preparations for a potential war with the Soviet Union.

Following Deng Xiaoping's Opening Up Policy, the site was restored by 1982 and sanctioned for "patriotic education" as a AAAA-rated tourist attraction. Replicas of the former relics were made, and a great marble statue of Genghis was completed in 1989. Priests at the museum now claim that all of the Red Guards who desecrated the tomb have died in abnormal ways, suffering a kind of curse.

Inner Mongolians continued to complain about the poor state of the mausoleum. A 2001 proposal for its refurbishment was finally approved in 2004. The 150-million- (about $20 million) improvement plan was carried out from 2005 to 2006, improving the site's infrastructure, expanding its courtyard, and decorating and repairing its existing buildings and walls. The China National Tourism Administration named the site a AAAAA-rated tourist attraction in 2011.

On 10 July 2015, 20 tourists aged 33 to 74—10 South Africans, 9 Britons, and an Indian—were detained at Ordos Ejin Horo Airport, arrested on terrorism-related charges the next day, and ultimately deported from China after they watched a BBC documentary about Genghis Khan in their hotel rooms prior to visiting the mausoleum. Authorities had considered it "watching and spreading violent terrorist videos".

In 2017, the Genghis Khan Mausoleum averaged about 8000 visitors a day during its peak season and about 200 visitors a day at other times.

Administration
The site is overseen by the Genghis Khan Mausoleum Administration Bureau. It was headed by Chageder and then Mengkeduren in the early 2000s.

Architecture 
 

The tomb complex consists of the Main Hall, the Imperial Burial Palace, the Western Hall, the Eastern Hall, the Western Corridor, and the Eastern Corridor.

It is shaped like a flying eagle as a symbol of the khan's bravery and adventurousness. Its plaque, reading "Mausoleum of Genghis Khan", was written by Ulanhu in 1985.

It has three yurts with yellow silk roofs; the central yurt houses the coffins of Genghis Khan and one of his four wives and the side yurts house the coffins of his brothers. Genghis Khan's coffin is silver decorated with engraved roses and a golden lock; weapons allegedly used by Genghis lie around it. There are also two other coffins for another two of his consorts. The site's main altar lies in front of this yurt. The cenotaph and its placement are highly unusual in China, which usually follows Han principles like feng shui in the placement of tombs, employing mountains, rivers, and forests in the belief that this increases its spiritual power.

It holds the coffin of Tolui (Genghis Khan's 4th and favourite son) and his wife Sorghaghtani.

It holds nine banners with holy arrows thought to house or connect with the soul of the Great Khan. They also represent 9 of Genghis's generals. It also holds Genghis's saddle and reins, some weapons, and some other objects like the khan's milk barrel. All of the items currently displayed are replicas.

The site uses a five-colour scheme of blue, red, white, gold, and green to represent the multiethnic nature of Genghis Khan's empire and also the sky, sun and fire, milk, earth, and prairie.

Worship 

Genghis Khan worship is a practice of Mongolian shamanism. There are other temples dedicated to this cult in Inner Mongolia and Northern China.

The mausoleum is guarded by the Darkhad or Darqads ("Untouchables"), who also oversee its religious festivals, stop tourists from taking photographs, keep candles lit, and watch over the site's keys and books. The 30 or so official Darkhad at the mausoleum are paid about 4000 a month for their services.

Mongols gather four times annually:
 21st day of the 3rd month of the Mongolian calendar, the most important
 15th day of the 5th lunar month
 12th day of the 9th lunar month
 Goat Hide Stripes Ceremony on the 3rd day of the 10th lunar month

There is also a major ceremony in honor of the Black Sülde on the 14th day of the 7th lunar month.

They follow traditional ceremonies, such as offering flowers and food to Heaven (Tengri). The ritual sacrifice to the spirit of Genghis Khan was listed as national-level intangible cultural heritage in 2006, and the sacrifice to the Black Sülde was given similar status at the provincial level in 2007. After the ceremonies, there are Naadam competitions, primarily wrestling, horse-riding, and archery, but also singing.

Performance
The mausoleum complex is also hosts three plays concerning the khan and Mongolian culture: Proud Son of Heaven: Eternal Genghis Khan or  The Mighty Genghis Khan, The Grand Ceremony of Genghis Khan, and An Ordos Wedding Ceremony. There is also an annual Genghis Khan Mausoleum Tourism Cultural Week.

Notes

References

Citations

Sources 
 .
 .
 .
 
 .
 .
 .
 .
 . 
 .
 .
 .
 .
 . 
 .
 .
 .
 
 .
 .
 .

External links 
 Official website ,& 
 Map of the site 
 Photos of the rituals on the 21st day of the 3rd lunar month, from China Daily
 Photos of the mausoleum, from People's Daily
 Photos of the mausoleum, from Getty Images

Buildings and structures in Ordos City
Buildings and structures completed in 1956
Major National Historical and Cultural Sites in Inner Mongolia
Genghis Khan
Genghis Khan